Invitation Only is an album by American country music singer Mickey Gilley. This album was released on May 20, 2003, on the Varèse Sarabande label.

Track listing
 "If I Didn't Know Your Memory Loved Jamaica"  – 3:37
 "All I've Got Against Him Is You"  – 3:44
 "Dancing to the Beat of a Broken Heart"  – 3:28
 "Keep the Night Away"  – 3:24
 "Invitation Only"  – 3:22
 "All Night Long"  – 2:51
 "Sadly Ever After"  – 3:08
 "Sure Got This Old Redneck Feeling Blue"  – 2:57
 "God's Country"  – 4:08
 "Under a Blue Moon Tonight"  – 3:37

References

External links
 Mickey Gilley's Official Website

Mickey Gilley albums
2003 albums
Albums produced by Larry Butler (producer)